Salacca wallichiana is a species of plant in the family Arecaceae. The specific epithet (wallichiana) honors Danish botanist Nathaniel Wallich. It is found in Malaysia, Thailand, Myanmar, and Sumatra. It is valued for its edible fruit which is consumed across its native range.

References

External links
 
 

Flora of Myanmar
wallichiana